This is a list of circuits which hosted CART/Champ Car racing from 1979 to 2007.

Champ Car events were held on 54 different circuits.  Phoenix International Raceway hosted the inaugural CART Series race, the 1979 Arizona Republic / Jimmy Bryan 150, and Autódromo Hermanos Rodríguez held the final Champ Car race, the 2007 Gran Premio Tecate.  Champ Car events were run on 21 ovals, twelve permanent road courses, and 21 temporary street circuits with 38 tracks located in the United States and 16 abroad.

Circuits

Timeline

Notes 

1. Only points-paying races are included.  In case of two races being part of the same event (held on one weekend), each of them is counted separately.
2. These tracks at Miami were street circuits so use the same abbreviation.
3. These tracks at Detroit were street circuits so use the same abbreviation.
4. These tracks at Denver were street circuits so use the same abbreviation.
5. These tracks at Houston were street circuits so use the same abbreviation.
6. Each of these circuits twice hosted the Marlboro Challenge, the only non-championship event staged by CART.
7. These tracks at Las Vegas were street circuits so use the same abbreviation.
8. The 2001 Firestone Firehawk 600 at Texas Motor Speedway was canceled after qualifying for driver safety concerns.

See also 
 List of Champ Car drivers
 List of fatal Champ Car accidents
 List of Champ Car pole positions
 List of Champ Car teams
 List of Champ Car winners
 List of Champ Car drivers who never qualified for a race

 List of IndyCar Series racetracks

 
Racetracks
Lists of motorsport venues
Lists of sports venues in the United States

de:Liste der IndyCar/ChampCar-Rennstrecken